Skoftebyns IF is a Swedish football club located in Trollhättan in Västra Götaland County.

Background
Since their foundation Skoftebyns IF has participated in the middle and lower divisions of the Swedish football league system.  The club currently plays in Division 2 Norra Götaland which is the fourth tier of Swedish football. They play their home matches at the Nysätra IP in Trollhättan.

Skoftebyns IF are affiliated to the Västergötlands Fotbollförbund.

Season to season

Attendances

In recent seasons Skoftebyns IF have had the following average attendances:

The former goalkeeper Mats Johansson began his career in Skoftebyn and later went to top league team IF Elfsborg and BK Häcken where he still reside as a goalkeepercoach.

Footnotes

External links
 Skoftebyns IF – Official website
 Skoftebyns IF Facebook

Sport in Västra Götaland County
Football clubs in Västra Götaland County
Association football clubs established in 1950
1950 establishments in Sweden